Kalle Järvinen (27 March 1903 – 25 August 1941) was a Finnish athlete. He competed in the men's shot put at the 1932 Summer Olympics. He was killed in action during World War II.

References

External links

1903 births
1941 deaths
Athletes (track and field) at the 1932 Summer Olympics
Finnish male shot putters
Olympic athletes of Finland
Finnish military personnel killed in World War II